DeObia Oparei (born 7 December 1971) is a British actor and playwright. He is best known for his roles as the Gunner in Pirates of the Caribbean: On Stranger Tides (2011), Rongo in Dumbo (2019), and as Boastful Loki in Loki (2021).

Early life
Oparei was born on 7 December 1971 in Hackney, London, to parents of Nigerian ancestry.

Career
Oparei began his career working for various British theatre companies, like The Royal Shakespeare Company and The National Youth Theatre. Oparei's film debut was a small supporting role in Alien 3. After playing the lead role of American playwright John Guare's Six Degrees of Separation, Oparei scored his next supporting film role, as "Le Chocolat", in the Baz Luhrmann film Moulin Rouge!. In 1993, he appeared in an episode of the popular British television series Minder as 'Winston', a worker for Arthur Daley.

Operai moved to Sydney, Australia in 1995, where he co-hosted the regular night ‘Magic’ upstairs at Kinselas with Basil, and performed Operai's ‘’Queen bitch rap’’ in cLUB bENT at The Performance Space, with Darren Spowart and Matthew Bergin.

Oparei is also a playwright. His first play, Crazyblackmuthafuckin'self, a dramedy about race, sexuality and identity, opened to critical acclaim at the Royal Court Theatre in 2002. The Guardian'''s Michael Billington described the play as "wild, raunchy and funny". The play later toured to Sydney, Australia, as part of the 2003 Company B Belvoir International Playreading Series, at the Belvoir Street Downstairs Theatre, on 11 August 2003.

In 2015, Oparei joined the cast of the HBO epic fantasy series Game of Thrones'' in its fifth season, portraying the character Areo Hotah.

Personal life 
On 5 June 2020, he came out as gay on Instagram.

Filmography

Film

Television

Shorts 
 2015: Clones

Synchronisations 
 2009: League of Legends
 2018: World of Warcraft: Battle for Azeroth

References

External links
 

1971 births
Living people
20th-century English male actors
21st-century English male actors
Black British male actors
English dramatists and playwrights
English male film actors
English male stage actors
English male television actors
English people of Nigerian descent
English gay actors
LGBT Black British people
Male actors from London
People from Hackney Central
21st-century LGBT people